Becoming is the third album by American black metal band Abigail Williams. It was released on January 24, 2012, via Candlelight Records. The album was met with highly positive reviews. It was thought to be the last album of the band, as they announced disbandment, however, later on, it was confirmed that Abigail Williams are getting together again for at least another album and a tour.

Promotion
The band originally released fliers and studio reports that suggested a new album was in the works. Later, on November 10, 2011, a song entitled "Ascension Sickness" was leaked over YouTube.

Supporting tour
Following a warm-up headlining gig in Trenton, New Jersey, Abigail Williams will be providing support for Norwegian black metal band Mayhem as their massive thirty-six date North American tour goes underway in Baltimore. Hate and Keep of Kalessin will both provide support for the entire trek as well, and Abigail Williams' labelmates Woe will also perform in eight cities of the tour.

Following the tour with Mayhem, Abigail Williams continued touring through the New Year in support of Becoming, with full stateside tours supporting Dark Funeral and then Deicide already confirmed for the first quarter of 2012, and much more in the planning stages for the months ahead.

Track listing

Personnel

Abigail Williams
 Ken Sorceron – all vocals, guitars
 Ian Jekelis – guitars
 Griffin Wotawa – bass guitar
 Zach Gibson – drums

Guest Musicians
 Ashley Ellyllon Jurgenmeyer – keyboards
 Sarah Batgirl Chaffee – cello

Production
 Ken Sorceron – producer
 Christophe Szpajdel – logo

References

2012 albums
Abigail Williams (band) albums
Candlelight Records albums